Habo is a small town in the Bari province of the autonomous Puntland region in northeastern Somalia.

Overview
Habo is located in the Alula District in the vicinity of the Guardafui Channel. It lies between the towns of Alula and Qandala. In antiquity, a cape to the east of Habo was known as the Cape of Spices, described in the 1st century CE Greek travelogue the Periplus of the Erythraean Sea. Habo was an important town for the ancient cinnamon and spice trade route. The town sustained damage from Italian bombardment during the Campaign of the Sultanates against the coastal regions in the late 1920s.

Economy
The main economic activities in the town are fishing, frankincense and date farming. Habo Tuna Factory is the largest employer in the town with 400 employees.

Education
According to the Puntland Ministry of Education, there is 1 primary school in Habo.

References

Puntland
Populated places in Bari, Somalia